95th Brigade may refer to:

 95th Mixed Brigade (Spain)
 95th Air Assault Brigade (Ukraine)
 95th Brigade (United Kingdom)
 95th Civil Affairs Brigade (United States)